Diego Rosmini (born 16 July 1927), also known as Direttore, is an Italian criminal and a member of the 'Ndrangheta in Calabria. He was the boss of the Rosmini 'ndrina based in the city of Reggio Calabria. He was born in Reggio Calabria.

Second 'Ndrangheta war

The Rosmini clan was a protagonist in the Second 'Ndrangheta war (1985–1991), which grouped all the 'ndrine in the city of Reggio Calabria into either one of two opposing factions: the Condello, Imerti, Serraino and Rosmini clans on one side, and the De Stefano 'ndrina, Tegano, Libri and Latella clans on the other.

Arrest and convictions
He was arrested on 4 December 1990, and received a life sentence and an additional 15-year sentence for murder and Mafia association. In 1998, he received a life sentence for ordering the killing in 1989 of the Christian Democrat politician Lodovico Ligato, former head of the Italian State Railways. Ligato demanded a 10 percent bribe on public work contracts, jeopardizing agreements already reached among a so-called "business committee" of local politicians and 'Ndrangheta groups. In March 2001, he received another life sentence.

He is currently in jail. His nephew Diego Rosmini, known as junior (he was born in 1955), took over the leadership of the clan.

References

  Gratteri, Nicola & Antonio Nicaso (2006). Fratelli di Sangue, Cosenza: Luigi Pellegrini Editore 

1927 births
'Ndranghetisti
People from Reggio Calabria
Possibly living people
'Ndranghetisti sentenced to life imprisonment
People convicted of murder by Italy